Edward Barker may refer to:

 Edward Barker (MP) (died 1602), English ecclesiastical lawyer and Member of Parliament
 Edward John Barker (1799–1884), English physician who emigrated to Upper Canada
 Ed Barker (1931–2012), American football wide receiver
 Edward Barker (cartoonist) (1950–1997), English cartoonist